Rona Barrett (born Rona Burstein, October 8, 1936) is an American gossip columnist and businesswoman. She runs the Rona Barrett Foundation, a non-profit organization in Santa Ynez, California, dedicated to the aid and support of senior citizens in need.

Early life and career
Barrett was born on October 8, 1936 in New York City. As a teenager, she overcame a degenerative hip condition that made walking extremely difficult, and organized fan clubs for popular singers she admired, such as Eddie Fisher and Steve Lawrence. She became a gossip columnist for the Bell-McClure Syndicate in 1957, and soon went to work for Bob Marcucci, the manager for teen idols Frankie Avalon and Fabian.

In 1966, she began broadcasting Hollywood gossip on the Los Angeles television station KABC-TV. She could be seen on TV regularly, appearing on ABC's five owned and operated stations around the country. WABC-TV in New York put her pre-recorded gossip segment into its nightly local news, but anchor Roger Grimsby generally introduced it by making disparaging comments about her. Barrett made Frank Sinatra's enemies list by criticizing his personal life, particularly his relationships with his children. Barrett also angered actor Ryan O'Neal after she wrote some unflattering things about him. To retaliate, he supposedly sent her a box containing a live tarantula. She developed the first in-depth personal TV specials about film, television, music, sports and political celebrities, and she had a series of magazines on the entertainment industry that were top-rated at newsstands, including Rona Barrett's Hollywood: Nothing but the Truth, published by Laufer Media. She also appeared on Jack Paar Tonite, where she clashed with Clement Freud.

Barrett began appearing on Good Morning America in 1975. In 1980, she moved to NBC's Today Show and was signed to co-host NBC's Tomorrow with Tom Snyder, but a public feud with Snyder, who regarded her as a correspondent rather than a co-host and refused to allow her segment to lead the show even when she had a major interview, resulted in her quitting the program in June 1981. She attempted other projects at NBC that either were rejected by the network as too costly or which, in the case of Television: Inside and Out, were relegated to poor timeslots.

After leaving NBC, Barrett was senior correspondent for Entertainment Tonight from 1983 to 1986. In 1989, she briefly returned to NBC to host 10 episodes of the morning show At Rona's. In 1990, she made a guest appearance as an interviewer at WWF's WrestleMania VI at Skydome (now Rogers Centre) in Toronto.

In 1991, she retired from the media and moved to her ranch in Santa Ynez, California, where she devoted her time running the Rona Barrett Foundation, an advocacy group for underserved senior citizens.

Acting
Barrett also made occasional film appearances, playing cameo roles in The Phynx (1970) and Sextette (1978). Mannix (Season 8, Episode 12)

Books
In 1972, her novel titled The Lovo-maniacs was published. Her autobiography Miss Rona was published in 1974. It began: "Just an inch, Miss Rona, just let me put it in an inch!" as an unnamed famous actor pleaded to be allowed to experience a modicum of sexual intercourse with her. In the book, she acknowledged having a nose job and discussed details of her teenage fan club involvements and her work with Frankie Avalon's management. She wrote the book How You Can Look Rich and Achieve Sexual Ecstasy (1978).

Honors
In 2009, a Golden Palm Star on the Palm Springs Walk of Stars was dedicated to her.

Commercial ventures
Barrett founded the Rona Barrett Lavender Company in Santa Ynez, California as a producer of lavender bath, beauty, food and aromatherapy products. The company follows a model of using celebrity-branded consumer goods to generate funds and raise awareness of a non-profit cause. A portion of all company proceeds were donated to the Rona Barrett Foundation. According to the foundation's website, they have ceased selling lavender products and the company has been sold.

Barrett started The Rona Barrett Foundation, a non-profit organization dedicated to the aid and support of senior citizen] in need, that was supported by a 2% portion of the profits from her lavender business until it ceased production. The foundation only takes direct donations and is working on building a village named "the Golden Inn and Cottages" for seniors in need of proper housing and care facilities. As of May 2012, it was a pilot program that was still under development.

Personal life
Barrett was married to Bill Trowbridge from September 22, 1973 until their divorce on October 19, 1982. They later reconciled and remained together until his death in 2001.

In 1986, she bought a ranch at Santa Ynez and began commuting to Los Angeles.

On February 14, 2008, she married Daniel Busby.

Filmography

Film

Television

PPV

References

Sources

External links
 Rona Barrett Foundation
 
 

1936 births
20th-century American memoirists
American women memoirists
American gossip columnists
American women columnists
Living people
20th-century American women writers
21st-century American women